Cannibal Capers is a Silly Symphonies animated Disney short film. It was released in 1930.

Plot 
The film begins with a group of cannibals gathering together for a tribal dance. The dance is later interrupted by a fierce lion who engages in a silly chase with one of the cannibals. The film ends with all of the cannibals surrounding the hysterical lion.

Reception 
The Film Daily (July 13, 1930): "One of Walt Disney's best Silly Symphonies to date. After the little band of cannibals have disported awhile in highly amusing fashion, a ferocious lion turns up and the whole gang takes to its heels. The cannibals' intended victim, however, jumps out of the boiling pot and gives the lion the run-around, winding up by getting hold of the lion's false teeth and using them to scare the jungle beast out of his skin."

Billboard (July 19, 1930): "Plenty of laughs to this animated cartoon of the Walt Disney Silly Symphony series. The conveying of numerous byplays sparkling with originality and cleverness, is a big factor in mirth producing, tho there's no overlooking the skillful animation... Strongest risibility tickler is the battle between a lion and the cannibals. Lion first chases the black-skin around, but the worm turns and the fellow has the battle won. Book this to give your audience laughs."

Home media
The short was released on December 19, 2006, on Walt Disney Treasures: More Silly Symphonies, Volume Two in the "From the Vault" section, because of the depiction of African natives.

References

External links 
 

American animated short films
1930 short films
1930s Disney animated short films
Silly Symphonies
1930 animated films
1930 films
Films directed by Burt Gillett
Films produced by Walt Disney
American black-and-white films
Columbia Pictures animated short films
Films about cannibalism
Columbia Pictures short films
Animated films without speech
1930s American films